Mohammad Hadj Kia Shemshaki (born 1955) is an Iranian alpine skier. He competed in three events at the 1976 Winter Olympics.

References

External links
 

1955 births
Living people
Iranian male alpine skiers
Olympic alpine skiers of Iran
Alpine skiers at the 1976 Winter Olympics
Sportspeople from Tehran